Orfeas Nicosia is a football club from the Cypriot capital of Nicosia.  It was founded in 1948. The club colors are yellow and green. It has participated in the Cypriot First Division four times, from 1959 until 1963. The club's highest achievement is finishing 7th in the 1961–62 season.

The club's home ground is unique in being situated adjacent to the medieval Venetian walls of Nicosia, now part of the United Nations Buffer Zone in Cyprus, which has divided the Greek and Turkish parts of the island since the Turkish invasion of 1974.

Achievements
Cypriot Second Division Winners: 2
 1958, 1965
Cypriot Third Division Winners: 1
 1979
Cypriot Fourth Division Winners: 1
 2003
Cypriot Fourth Division 3rd Place: 1
 2008

References

Association football clubs established in 1948
Football clubs in Cyprus
Football clubs in Nicosia
1948 establishments in Cyprus